Lee Ho-joon (born February 14, 2001) is a South Korean swimmer.

Career
In July 2021, he represented South Korea at the 2020 Summer Olympics held in Tokyo, Japan. He competed in the 400m freestyle and 4 × 200m freestyle relay events. In the freestyle event, he did not advance to compete in the semifinal. In the freestyle relay event, the team did not advance to compete in the final.

References

External links
 
 

2001 births
Living people
Swimmers from Seoul
Sportspeople from Daegu
Swimmers at the 2020 Summer Olympics
South Korean male freestyle swimmers
Olympic swimmers of South Korea
21st-century South Korean people
Swimmers at the 2018 Asian Games